Bielsk may refer to:

Bielsk, Kuyavian-Pomeranian Voivodeship (north-central Poland)
Bielsk, Masovian Voivodeship (east-central Poland)
Bielsk Podlaski in Podlaskie Voivodeship (north-east Poland)
Bielsk, Pomeranian Voivodeship (north Poland)
 Bielsk County, an administrative district whose seat is Bielsk Podlaski
 Gmina Bielsk Podlaski, an administrative district within Bielsk County
 Gmina Bielsk, an administrative district whose seat is Bielsk, Masovian Voivodeship

See also
 Bielsko-Biała, a city in Silesian Voivodeship, southern Poland
 Bielsko (disambiguation)